The year 1687 in music involved some significant events.

Events
January 30 – Louis XIV's entrance into the city hall inspires André Raison to write his offertory, subtitled "Vive le Roi de Parisiens" ("Long live the King of Parisians").
During a performance of his own Te Deum, Jean-Baptiste Lully injures his foot with the point of his cane; this results in death from gangrene a few weeks later.
Jean-Nicolas Francine, Lully's son-in-law, becomes director of the Paris Opera.

Publications
Angelo Berardi – Documenti armonici
Le Sieur Danoville – L'Art de toucher le dessus et le basse de violle
Jean Rosseau – Traité de la viole

Classical music
John Blow – Ode for New Year's Day
Dieterich Buxtehude 
Bedenke Mensch das Ende, BuxWV 9
Der Herr ist mit mir, BuxWV 15
Domine salvum fac regem, BuxWV 18
Eins bitte ich vom Herrn, BuxWV 24
Herren vår Gud, BuxWV 40
Marc-Antoine Charpentier  
Regina coeli, H.30
Sub tuum praesidium, H.352
Michel Richard Delalande – Super flumina Babylonis, S.13
Giovanni Antonio Gianettini – L'uomo in bivio
Elisabeth Jacquet de La Guerre – Pièces de clavecin, Livre 1
Nicolas Lebègue – Pieces de Clavessin, Livre 2
Isabella Leonarda 
Mottetti a 1, 2 e 3 voci con violini, e senza, Op.13
Motetti a voce sola, Op.14
Bernardo Pasquini – I fatti di Mosè nel deserto
Henry Purcell  
Sound the Trumpet, Beat the Drum, Z.335
Oh Solitude, Z.406
Suite in G major, Z.662
A Song Tune, ZT.695
Johann Adam Reincken – Hortus Musicus
Gregorio Strozzi – Capricci da sonare cembali et organi
Giovanni Battista degli Antoni 
Ricercate, Op. 1, one of the earliest examples of music for solo cello
Versetti per tutti li tuoni, tanto naturali, Op. 2, one of the largest Italian publications of liturgical organ versets of the era

Opera
Antonio Draghi – La vendetta dell'onestà
Giuseppe Fabrini – Lodovico
Jean-Baptiste Lully, Pascal Collasse – Achille et Polyxène
Carlo Pallavicino – La Gerusalemme Liberata
André Danican Philidor – Le Canal de Versailles
Bernardo Sabadini – Didio Giuliano
Agostino Steffani – Alarico

Births
February 1 – Johann Adam Birkenstock, violinist and composer (died 1733)
June 7 – Gaetano Berenstadt, castrato singer (died 1734)
July 16 – Paolo Antonio Rolli, librettist (died 1765)
c. August 26 – Henry Carey, poet, dramatist, songwriter and theatrical composer (suicide 1743)
October 12 – Sylvius Leopold Weiss, lutenist and composer (died 1750)
November 23 – Jean Baptiste Senaillé, violinist and composer (died 1730)
December 5 – Francesco Geminiani, composer (died 1762)
December 26 – Johann Georg Pisendel, composer (died 1755)
date unknown 
Willem de Fesch, musician and composer (died 1761)
William Hine, composer (died 1730)
Charles King, musician and composer (died 1748) 
François-Augustin de Paradis de Moncrif, librettist (died 1770)

Deaths
March 22 – Jean-Baptiste Lully, composer (born 1632)
March 28 – Constantijn Huygens, Dutch poet and composer (born 1596)
April 25 – Johannes Caioni, priest, musician and organ repairer
August 24 – Michael Wise, composer (born c. 1647)
December 5 – Ercole Bernabei, composer (born 1622)
date unknown
John Gamble, court musician and composer 
Giovanni Battista Granata, guitarist and composer (born c.1621)
Gregorio Strozzi, composer (born 1615)
Michael Wise, organist and composer (born 1648)
Giovanni Antonio Pandolfi Mealli (1624-1687)

 
17th century in music
Music by year